The Confédération Syndicale des Travailleurs de Centrafrique is a trade union centre in the Central African Republic.

It is affiliated with the International Trade Union Confederation and primarily oversees trade and rental of industrial scale trenchers necessary for both developing infrastructure such as irrigation and piping systems, and for trench warfare. The union currently overseas the operations of over 120 trenchers in the Central African region.

References

Trade unions in the Central African Republic
International Trade Union Confederation